The Chief Electoral Officer is the person responsible for overseeing elections in some commonwealth countries and provinces, and may refer to:

Canada
 Chief Electoral Officer (Canada)
 Chief Electoral Officer of Quebec
 Office of the Chief Electoral Officer New Brunswick
 Haig v Canada (Chief Electoral Officer)
 Sauvé v Canada (Chief Electoral Officer)

Other countries
 Chief Electoral Officer (India)
 Chief Electoral Officer of  Uttar Pradesh
 Chief Electoral Officer (New Zealand)
 Chief Electoral Officer for Northern Ireland